Twilight of the Thunder God is the seventh studio album by the Swedish melodic death metal band Amon Amarth. Twilight of the Thunder God was released in September 2008. The album's name and title track refer to Thor's slaying of the Midgard Serpent Jörmungandr.

Background
In anticipation of this album, there was a series of six vlog-format studio diaries which displayed the recording process of this album in the studio. The first focused on Fredrik Andersson recording the drums. The second vlog focused on Olavi Mikkonen recording the rhythm guitar position. The third vlog focused on Ted Lundström recording bass guitar and band members preparing food. The fourth episode focused on Johan Hegg recording vocals. The fifth video was Johan Söderberg performing and recording guitar solos. The final vlog featured Olavi Mikkonen and Ted Lundström packing up the studio, as well as an album preview.

A series of 8-page comics were made during the production of the album, eponymously entitled "Twilight of the Thunder God", released in magazines throughout Europe.

On 27 June 2008, the title of this album was announced. Twilight of the Thunder God features several guest appearances featuring Entombed vocalist Lars-Göran Petrov on "Guardians of Asgaard", Children of Bodom and Stone guitarist Roope Latvala who contributes a solo on the track "Twilight of the Thunder God", and Finnish cello metal band Apocalyptica guesting on "Live for the Kill".

Approximately a month later on 25 July 2008, the album artwork was revealed, featuring Thor, the Norse God of Thunder, in battle with Jörmungandr.

On 27 August 2008, Amon Amarth released the information that they had recently finished work on a video clip for the title track of the album. The video clip was shot in Jomsborg, Poland. The band notes that while they were there, a heavy storm came through the town, resulting in the roughest conditions the band has ever shot a music video in.

Reception

The album debuted at number 50 on the Billboard 200, and debuted at number 11 on the Swedish album charts. This makes the band's first album to chart on the top 200, and also the band's highest chart debut in their native country of Sweden, debuting 10 places higher than their previous release, With Oden on Our Side.

Initial critical response to Twilight of the Thunder God was positive. At Metacritic, which assigns a normalized rating out of 100 to reviews from mainstream critics, the album has received an average score of 80, based on 5 reviews.

The album was ranked number six on Metal Hammer's Top 50 Albums of 2008.

Legacy
Swedish heavy metal band Sabaton covered "Twilight of the Thunder God" as a bonus track on various renditions of their 2012 album Carolus Rex.

In 2013, Corvus Corax released a cover of "Twilight of the Thunder God" on their album Gimlie

In 2017, Swiss metal band Rage of Light released a cover version of "Twilight of the Thunder God".

In 2021, Feuerschwanz released a cover of "Twilight of the Thunder God" on the Deluxe Edition of their album Memento Mori.

Track listing

Personnel

Band members
Johan Hegg − vocals
Olavi Mikkonen − lead guitar
Johan Söderberg − rhythm guitar
Ted Lundström − bass
Fredrik Andersson − drums

Guest musicians 
Lars-Göran Petrov (Entombed) − vocals on "Guardians of Asgaard"
Roope Latvala (Children of Bodom) − guitar solo on "Twilight of the Thunder God"
Apocalyptica − cellos on "Live for the Kill"
Ronny Milianowicz (ex-Sinergy) – horns, brass, choir vocals

Credits
Tom Thiel − album artwork
Peter Damin − drum technician

Release history

References

Amon Amarth albums
Metal Blade Records albums
2008 albums
Albums produced by Jens Bogren